William Roy DeWitt Wallace; (November 12, 1889 – March 30, 1981), publishing as  DeWitt Wallace, was an American magazine publisher.

Wallace co-founded Reader's Digest with his wife Lila Bell Wallace, publishing the first issue in 1922.

Life and career
Born in St. Paul, Minnesota, where his father was on the faculty (and later president) of Macalester College, he attended Mount Hermon School as a youth (now Northfield Mount Hermon School). Wallace attended college at Macalester from 1907 to 1909 and transferred to the University of California, Berkeley for two years. He returned to St. Paul in 1912 and was hired by a publishing firm specializing in farming literature.

During World War I, Wallace enlisted in the U.S. Army and was wounded. He spent four months in a French hospital recovering from his injuries, passing the time by reading American magazines.

Returning to the U.S., Wallace spent every day of the next six months at the Minneapolis Public Library researching and condensing magazine articles. He wanted to create a magazine with articles on a wide variety of subjects, abridged so that each could be easily read. Wallace showed his sample magazine to Lila Bell Acheson, sister of an old college friend, Barclay Acheson, who responded enthusiastically. He proposed to her and on October 15, 1921, they were married.

The Wallaces decided to publish the magazine themselves and market it by direct mail. The first issue appeared on February 5, 1922. Reader's Digest soon became one of the most widely circulated periodicals in the world. Wallace was a supporter of the Republican Party with strong anti-communist views, and the magazine reflected these beliefs. Wallace and his wife were strong supporters of Richard Nixon's presidential bid in 1968, giving Nixon cash donations and allowing Nixon to write articles for the Digest.

Wallace was a noted philanthropist, donating much of his massive fortune to his alma mater Macalester College. The Wallaces also established a number of foundations that are now consolidated as The Wallace Foundation, which supports education, youth development and the arts.  There is a dormitory with his name on the Northfield Mount Hermon campus. He funded the DeWitt Wallace Decorative Arts Museum, opened in 1985 at Colonial Williamsburg, Virginia.

On January 28, 1972, DeWitt Wallace was presented with the Presidential Medal of Freedom by President Richard Nixon.

Wallace was inducted into the Junior Achievement U.S. Business Hall of Fame in 1980.

Wallace died at his home in Mount Kisco, New York, on March 30, 1981. He left no children with his wife Lila. His niece, Julia Acheson, was married to The New York Times executive Fred D. Thompson.

Awards and honors
 Golden Plate Award of the American Academy of Achievement (1966)
 Presidential Medal of Freedom (1972)
 Junior Achievement U.S. Business Hall of Fame (1980)

See also
 Glynwood Center

References

External links
The American Presidency Project

1890 births
1981 deaths
Businesspeople from Saint Paul, Minnesota
Military personnel from Minnesota
American magazine founders
American magazine publishers (people)
Northfield Mount Hermon School alumni
Reader's Digest
People from Mount Pleasant, New York
Philanthropists from New York (state)
United States Army personnel of World War I
Macalester College alumni
Presidential Medal of Freedom recipients
Minnesota Republicans
20th-century American philanthropists
20th-century American businesspeople
American anti-communists
New Right (United States)